Luboš Zákostelský (born 25 September 1967) is a Czech former football player and a football manager. As a player, he played as a forward, making more than 150 appearances in the Gambrinus liga. He also played in lower-level competitions in Austria, Japan and Germany.

His son Jan Zákostelský is also a football player.

References

External links
 Manager Profile at idnes.cz 
 Player Profile at idnes.cz 

1967 births
Living people
Czech footballers
Czechoslovak footballers
SK Slavia Prague players
SK Benešov players
FC Slovan Liberec players
FK Chmel Blšany players
Czech football managers
FK Čáslav managers
FC Vysočina Jihlava managers
Association football forwards
FC Viktoria Plzeň players
Hokkaido Consadole Sapporo players
Expatriate footballers in Japan